Thomas John Fahey (born 27 August 1943) is an Australian former equestrian. He competed at the 1964 Summer Olympics and the 1968 Summer Olympics.

References

External links
 

1943 births
Living people
Australian male equestrians
Olympic equestrians of Australia
Equestrians at the 1964 Summer Olympics
Equestrians at the 1968 Summer Olympics
People from Taree
Sportsmen from New South Wales